Nucleophaga is a genus of eukaryotic microorganisms that are internal parasites of amoeba, flagellates, and ciliates.

Morphology and life cycle
Nucleophaga grows within the nucleus of its host cell. Its spores are ingested by the host and migrate to the nucleus. Once in the nucleus, the spores germinate giving rise to naked plasmodia in contact with the host's karyoplasm. It develops pseudopodia-like projections that may be involved in osmotrophy or phagocytosis. The Nucleophaga cells continue to enlarge until a cell wall replaces the projections and the Nucleophaga cytoplasm is divided into spores.

Taxonomy
Described by Dangeard in 1895, Nucleophaga was placed in Olpidiaceae, Chytridiales. Molecular phylogenetic studies have placed some members in the Cryptomycota/Rozellomycota.

Species
As according to a taxonomic summary.
 Nucleophaga amoebae Dangeard 1895 
 Nucleophaga hypertrophica Epstein 1922
 Nucleophaga intestinalis Brug 1926
 Nucleophaga peranemae Hollande & Balsac 1941
 Nucleophaga ranarum Lavier 1935
 Nucleophaga terricolae  Corsaro et al. 2006

References

Eukaryote genera
Holomycota